Lee's Legion (also known as the 2nd Partisan Corps) was a military unit within the Continental Army during the American Revolution. It primarily served in the Southern Theater of Operations, and gained a reputation for efficiency, bravery on the battlefield and ruthlessness equal to that of Tarleton's Raiders.

The original unit was raised June 8, 1776, at Williamsburg, Virginia, under the command of Henry "Light Horse Harry" Lee for service with the 1st Continental Light Dragoons of the Continental Army. On April 7, 1778, the Legion left the 1st CLDs and became known as Lee's Legion. It included elements of both cavalry and foot, and typically was uniformed with short green woolen jackets and white linen or doeskin pants, somewhat mimicking the British Legion in appearance. The unit first saw action in September of that year, defeating a Hessian regiment in an ambush. When Lord Cornwallis moved his British Army into North Carolina, Lee's Legion entered South Carolina to protect that colony, to intimidate Loyalists and harass British expeditions. Often, the Legion served with Francis Marion and Thomas Sumter in these missions. In 1781, it participated in Pyle's massacre and the siege of Ninety Six.

The Legion saw considerable action at the Battle of Guilford Court House, and the retaking of South Carolina. The Legion was disbanded at Winchester, Virginia, on November 15, 1783.

United States Marshal Robert Forsyth was a member of Lee's Legion.

References

Further reading
 Lee's Legion Remembered: Profiles of the 2nd Partisan Corps (.pdf)

External links
 North West Territory Alliance Congressional Forces Lee's Legion 5th Troop Reenactors

Cavalry units and formations of the United States Army
Military units and formations established in 1776
Military units and formations of the Continental Army
Virginia in the American Revolution
Dragoons
Light Dragoons
1776 establishments in Virginia